Palais des Sports de Beaulieu is an indoor sporting arena located in Nantes, France. Built in 1973, the seating capacity of the arena is for 5,500 people. It is currently home to the HBC Nantes handball team.
The arena hosted the 1974 European champions cup final in basketball in which Real Madrid defeated Ignis Varese 84–82, the 1983 European basketball championship finals and the 1992 European Cup final in which Real Madrid defeated P.A.O.K. Thessaloniki.

References

Indoor arenas in France
Buildings and structures in Nantes
Basketball venues in France
Handball venues in France
Boxing venues in France
Sports venues in Loire-Atlantique
Sports venues completed in 1973